Senator Horner may refer to:

Maxine Horner (1933–2021), Oklahoma State Senate
Rick Horner (born 1957), North Carolina State Senate